Nikolai Ivanovich Kibalchich (Mykola Ivanovych Kybalchych; 19 October 1853 – April 3, 1881) was a Ukrainian revolutionary of Ukrainian-Serbian origin in Russian empire, who took part in the assassination of Tsar Alexander II as the main explosive expert for Narodnaya Volya (the People's Will), and was also a rocket pioneer. He was a distant cousin of revolutionary Victor Serge.

Early life
Born in Korop, Krolevetsky Uyezd, Chernigov Governorate (present-day Ukraine) in 1853 into a clerical family, Kibalchich was the son of an Orthodox parish priest. He entered a gymnasium in 1864 but was later admitted to a seminary. But he returned to secondary school and finishing it with a silver medal several years later.

In 1871 he entered St Petersburg Institute of Railway Engineers and in 1873 he entered Saint Petersburg Emperor Military Medical Academy to study medicine and worked on experiments into pulsed rocket propulsion.

Biography
In October 1875, Kibalchich was arrested for lending a prohibited book to a peasant. He spent 3 years in prison before being sentenced to 2 months imprisonment.

He went on to join Narodnaya Volya in 1878, becoming their main explosives expert.

Assassination of Alexander II

During the night from February 28 to March 1, Mykolaj and his assistants, Fleet Lieutenant Sukhnanov and Mikhail Grachvesky, prepared four explosive projectiles. They were used in the assassination of Alexander II. later that day. Kibalchich was arrested on March 17.

"When his men came to see Kibalchich as his appointed counsel for the defense," said V.N Gerard in his statement to the special committee of the senate, "I was surprised above all by the fact that his mind was occupied with completely different things with no bearing on the present trial. He seems to be immersed in research on some aeronautic missile; he thirsted for a possibility to write down his mathematical calculations involved in the discovery. He wrote them down and submitted them to the authorities."

In a note written in his prison cell, Kibalchich proposed a manned jet air-navigating apparatus. He examined the design of powder rocket engine, controlling the flight by changing engines angle, the pro note is dated March 23. He produced this scientific work truly at death's door.

On March 26, General Komarov, Chief of the Gendarmery Department, informed the Police Department: "Pursuant to the request from Nikolai Kibalchich, the son of the priest, who is accused of high treason, I have the honor to present hereby his design of an aeronautic device."

The brief written in the report said: "To be filed with the March 1 dossier and to give this to 
scientists for consideration now would hardly be expedient since this can only give rise to a lot of wanton talk. Kibalchich’s design was put in an envelope, sealed and filed. The inventor was told that his design would be handed over to scientists for examination.

Kibalchich awaited for their answer. The month of March was at an end, with two days left before execution. On March 31 Kibalchich wrote this solicitation address to the Minister of Interior: “By instruction of your Excellency my design of an aeronautic apparatus has been submitted for the consideration of technical committee; could your Excellency direct that I be allowed to meet with any of the committee members on the matter of this design not later than tomorrow morning or at least to receive a written answer from the experts who have examined my design, also no longer than tomorrow.

I also ask your Excellency for permission for me, before I die, to meet with all my comrades
in the trial or at least with Zhelyabov and Perovskaya." All the requests were ignored.

Execution and legacy

At 7:50 am on the sunny spring morning of April 3 two “chariots of shame” with the 
condemned prisoners rode out of the house of the detention to Shpalernaya Street. Zhelyabov was 
in the first, and by his side was Rysakov, who had tossed the first bomb at the coach of 
Alexander II and then betrayed his comrades during the interrogation. Kibalchich, Perovskaya and Mikhailov were in the second. The hands and feet of the condemned were tied to the seats. Each had on his chest a black plaque with the white colored inscription: “A regicide”.

At 9:21 am the executioner removed the foot stool from under the feet of Kibalchich. Mikhailov, Perovskaya, Zhelyabov and Rysakov were executed after him.

Thus, Kybalchych and other Narodnaya Volya plotters including Sophia Perovskaya, Andrei Zhelyabov, Nikolai Rysakov and Timofei Mikhailov were hanged on April 3, 1881.

The fate of the invention, mentioned in Kybalchych's last letter, proved to be as tragic as that of its 27-year-old creator. Kibalchich's 
design was buried in the archives of Police Department, but the tsar authorities failed to consign 
the name of the inventor and his idea to oblivion. The trial and execution of the Narodniks had wide 
repercussions around the world. Much was said and written about Kibalchich's design abroad and all
kinds of conjectures were made about the essence of the invention and its subsequent fate. In 1917, Nikolai Rynin rediscovered the manuscript in the archives and published an account of it 1918 in the historic magazine Byloye (Былое, The Past).

In 1891, similar ideas were developed independently by the German engineer Hermann Ganswindt. After WWII, Stanislaw Ulam proposed a nuclear pulse propulsion scheme which was studied in Project ORION.

The International Astronomical Union honoured the rocketry pioneer by naming a crater on the moon Kibalchich's crater(Kibal'chich). Located at 3.0° N 146.5° W, the Moon's far side.

Final letter

The Dream of a propulsive device by a Scientist that was stolen by death

"I, Nikolai Kibalchich, am writing down this design in prison with several days to go before my 
execution. I believed in the practicability of my idea and this belief sustains me in my appalling situation by scientists and specialists who show my idea to be practicable, I will feel happy in the knowledge that I have rendered an immense service to my country and mankind.  I will then calmly meet death, knowing that my idea will not die with me but will remain with mankind for which I prepared to sacrifice my life. That is why I pray to those scientists who will examine my design that they treat it with the utmost seriousness and good faith and let me know their answer as soon as possible.

First and foremost I need it necessary to note that, when at large, I did not have time to 
elaborate my design in details and prove its feasibility mathematically. Now it is, of course 
impossible for me to obtain the materials necessary for that. Consequently, this task that of 
substantiating my design with mathematical calculation will have to be done by those experts 
into whose hands my design will find its way.

Besides, I am not familiar with the mass of similar design which have, appeared lately; that is
to say I am aware of the idea behind those designs but I am not familiar with the way whereby the inventors hope to carry them out. As far as I know, however my idea has not yet been proposed by anyone else.

In my thought about an aeronautic machine I have concentrated mainly on this question: what force has to be applied in order to set such machine in motion? In my opinion it is slowly burning explosive substances that can provide such a force.

In fact, the combustion of explosive substance results with a comparative rapidity in large 
quantity of gases possessing a huge energy at the instance of their formation. But can one use 
the energy of gases, formed by explosive ignition, to perform work of any duration? This is 
possible only if the huge energy of explosive combustion, rather than last instantaneously, 
will be generated during a more or less prolonged period of time."

Legacy

In the April 1918 issue of the Byloye magazine, Nikolai Rynin
published Kibalchich's description of a manned, rocket-propelled ship, from his final letter. The letter had been filed in police archives until Rynin fished it out, after hearing rumors of the design.

References

External links

 Croft, Lee B. Nikolai Ivanovich Kibalchich: Terrorist Rocket Pioneer. IIHS. 2006. .
 Encyclopedia of Astrobiology, Astronomy and Spaceflight
 
 Суд над цареубийцами. Дело 1-го марта 1881 года. Под редакцией В.В.Разбегаева. Изд. им. Н.И.Новикова. С-Пб том 1 и 2. 2014., 

1853 births
1881 deaths
People from Chernihiv Oblast
People from Krolevetsky Uyezd
Narodniks
Narodnaya Volya
19th-century scientists from the Russian Empire
Russian inventors
Early rocketry
Early spaceflight scientists
Executed Russian people
Executed revolutionaries
People executed by the Russian Empire by hanging
Russian people of Serbian descent